In music, a musical ensemble or band is a group of musicians that works together to perform music. The following articles concern types of musical bands:

 All-female band
 Big band
 Boy band
 Christian band
 Church music
 Concert band
 Cover band
 Dansband
 Fife and drum
 Garage rock band
 Girl group
 Heavy metal band
 Family band
 Jam band 
 Jazz band
 Jug band
 Klezmer band
 Marching band
 Military band
 Orchestra
 Organ trio
 Rock band
 Rock Supergroup
 School band
 Ska band
 Studio band
 Tribute act
 Worship band

 Types